Easton Ongaro (born June 5, 1998) is a Canadian professional soccer player who plays as a forward for Pacific FC.

Club career

Early career
In 2016, Ongaro began playing at the senior amateur level in the Alberta Major Soccer League with the Edmonton Green & Gold, scoring two goals in eight appearances that season. The following season he doubled his tally, scoring four goals in thirteen appearances. In 2018, Ongaro led the league in scoring with thirteen goals in nine appearances.

In October 2018, Ongaro was selected 15th overall in the 2018 CPL–U Sports Draft by Calgary-based club Cavalry FC.

FC Edmonton
On 1 May 2019, Ongaro signed with his hometown club, FC Edmonton, after he was released by Cavalry FC. On 12 June 2019, Ongaro made his debut as a substitute against York9 FC in the Canadian Championship. The following weekend he made his league debut as a substitute in the Al Classico against his draft club, Cavalry FC. He scored his first goal for Edmonton on July 27 against Forge FC. Ongaro finished the season with a team-high ten goals in 21 league appearances, finishing fourth among the league's top scorers. On 12 November 2019, Ongaro re-signed with FC Edmonton on a multi-year contract.

Edmonton had a disastrous shortened 2020 season, managing only a single point in seven games. Nevertheless, Ongaro again led the club in goals, scoring three while playing in every game.

In 2021, he had a slow start to the season, but by August began to get into excellent form, developing a partnership with new signing Tobias Warschewski, who assisted many of his goals. Ultimately, Ongaro again had an individually successful season, while his team's season was disappointing, as the Eddies finished in seventh place. However, Ongaro scored 12 goals in 27 appearances, good for second league-wide. Upon completion of the season, Ongaro would express a desire to play in Europe, and eventually signed in Romania. After three seasons with Edmonton he left as the Canadian Premier League's all time top goalscorer, with 25 goals.

Loan to Vendsyssel FF
On 4 October 2020, Ongaro was loaned to Danish 1st Division side Vendsyssel FF until the end of the calendar year. The deal also included an option to buy at the end of the loan period. He made his debut on 7 October in a Danish Cup tie against Aarhus Fremad. On 31 December 2020, Vendsyssel declined the option to purchase Ongaro at the end of the loan, and he returned to Edmonton for the 2021 season.

UTA Arad
On 12 January 2022, Ongaro signed with Romanian Liga I side UTA Arad. He made his first appearance for the club on January 23 against Gaz Metan Mediaș. Ongaro scored his first goal for UTA Arad on February 18, netting a late equalizer in a 1-1 draw against Universitatea Craiova. He departed the club in May 2022, after a spell that was marred by injury. After departing Arad, he went to train with his former club FC Edmonton, with no plans to join the club on a permanent contract, only to train for fitness.

Whitecaps FC 2
In July 2022, he signed with Whitecaps FC 2 in MLS Next Pro. He made his debut on July 24, scoring two goals against Colorado Rapids 2. In August, he signed a short-term loan with the first team for their match against the LA Galaxy on August 13.

Pacific FC
In November 2022, Ongaro returned to the Canadian Premier League, signing with Pacific FC.

International career
Ongaro was named to the Canadian U-23 provisional roster for the 2020 CONCACAF Men's Olympic Qualifying Championship on 26 February 2020.

Personal life
He is the nephew of former Canadian professional soccer player Ross Ongaro. He also holds an Italian passport.

Career statistics

References

External links

1998 births
Living people
Canadian people of Italian descent
Association football forwards
Canadian soccer players
Soccer players from Edmonton
Canadian expatriate soccer players
Expatriate men's footballers in Denmark
Canadian expatriate sportspeople in Denmark
Expatriate footballers in Romania
Canadian expatriate sportspeople in Romania
Alberta Golden Bears players
Cavalry FC draft picks
FC Edmonton players
Vendsyssel FF players
FC UTA Arad players
Canadian Premier League players
Danish 1st Division players
Liga I players
Whitecaps FC 2 players
MLS Next Pro players